The 1987–88 Oklahoma Sooners men's basketball team represented the University of Oklahoma in competitive college basketball during the 1987–88 NCAA Division I men's basketball season. The Oklahoma Sooners men's basketball team played its home games in the Lloyd Noble Center and was a member of the National Collegiate Athletic Association's (NCAA) former Big Eight Conference at that time.  The team posted a 35–4 overall record and a 12–2 conference record to earn the Conference title under head coach Billy Tubbs.  This was the third Big Eight Conference Regular Season Championship for Tubbs and his second Big Eight Conference tournament Championship.

The team was led by three future NBA draft first round selections: Harvey Grant, Stacey King and Mookie Blaylock.  Grant and King earned All-American recognition that season. The team won its first 14 games before losing back to back contests to unranked  and Kansas State.  The team then won 12 consecutive games before falling to unranked Missouri in overtime in its penultimate regular season game.  The team then ran off 9 more wins taking it to the championship game of the 1988 NCAA Division I men's basketball tournament where it lost to Kansas.  The team defeated all five ranked opponents it faced during the season. (In order, #6 Pitt, #12 Iowa State twice, a rematch against #14 Kansas State, and #2 Arizona in the final four).

Mookie Blaylock established the current National Collegiate Athletic Association Division I college basketball single-season steals (150) and single-game steals (13) records.  Stacey King set the current Oklahoma Sooners men's basketball single-season blocked shots (103) record. Ricky Grace set the single-season assists (280) record.   The team holds numerous Sooner records including wins (35), and points per game (102.5).

Roster

Schedule

|-
! colspan=9 style="background:#960018; color:#FFFDD0;"| Regular Season

|-
! colspan=9 style="background:#960018; color:#FFFDD0;"| Phillips 66 Big 8 Tournament

|-
! colspan=9 style="background:#960018; color:#FFFDD0;"| NCAA Tournament

Rankings

NCAA basketball tournament

The following is a summary of the team's performance in the NCAA Division I men's basketball tournament:
Southeast
 Oklahoma (1) 94,  (16) 66
 Oklahoma 107, Auburn (8) 87
Oklahoma 108, Louisville (5) 98 (Sweet 16)
Oklahoma 78, Villanova (6) 59 (Regional Final)
Final Four
Oklahoma 86, Arizona 78
Kansas 83, Oklahoma 79

Honors
All-American: Harvey Grant and Stacey King (1st of 2 times)
Big Eight tournament MVP: King
NCAA Tournament Southeast Regional MVP: King

Team players drafted into the NBA
The following players were drafted in the 1988 NBA draft:

The following players were varsity letter-winners from this team who were drafted in the NBA draft in later years:
1989 NBA draft: Stacey King (1st, 6th, Chicago Bulls),  Mookie Blaylock (1st, 12th, New Jersey Nets)

References

Oklahoma Sooners men's basketball seasons
NCAA Division I men's basketball tournament Final Four seasons
Oklahoma
Oklahoma